Lancot Meadow is a  nature reserve in western Dunstable in Bedfordshire. It is managed by the Wildlife Trust for Bedfordshire, Cambridgeshire and Northamptonshire.

The site is a grassland remnant on chalk soil, and a remnant of flower-rich meadows in the area. Flora include common spotted-orchids, ox-eye daisies and bird's foot trefoils. There are fauna such as song thrushes and marbled white butterflies. Hedgerows provide and additional habitat.

There is access from Badgers Gate.

References

Nature reserves in Bedfordshire
Wildlife Trust for Bedfordshire, Cambridgeshire and Northamptonshire reserves
Meadows in Bedfordshire